Julia Sakharova is a professional violinist. A native of Zheleznovodsk, Russia, she debuted at the age of eight with the Moldavian Symphony Orchestra. Her mother is also a musician. By the age of 11, she was already internationally known as a child prodigy due to her skills on the violin.  At the age of 15, she won the top prize in the International Competition for Music of Eastern and Central Europe; Vladimir Spivakov, the head of the jury, presented her with his bow in addition to the prize. She attended Oberlin College, graduating in 2003 with a major in violin performance; she studied under Milan Vitek while there. That same year, she competed in the Concours International de Montréal des Jeunesses Musicales, and won sixth prize. In 2005, she visited Caracas, Venezuela to perform with the National Philharmonic Orchestra there. She has been Assistant Concertmaster of the Alabama Symphony Orchestra since 2008. Since 2012 Sakharova is the newest member of the Arianna String Quartet which is on Residence at the University of Missouri St. Louis. She is part of the Music Faculty as Associate Professor of Violin.

Education 
Graduated from Moscow's Central Special Music School. Graduated from Oberlin College in 2003, studying with Taras Gabora, Almita Vamos and Milan Vitek. Received a master's degree from the Juilliard School in 2006, studying with Donald Weilerstein.

Discography 
2001 – Rachmaninoff: The Élégiaque Piano Trios (Tavros Records) – with cellist Margrét Arnadóttir and pianist Yung Wook Yoo
2015 – Beethoven: The Early String Quartets, Opus 18 (Centaur Records) – as part of the Arianna String Quartet
2017 – Beethoven: The Middle Quartets (Centaur Records) – as part of the Arianna String Quartet

References

External links 
 

Year of birth missing (living people)
Living people
People from Zheleznovodsk
Russian classical violinists
Manhattan School of Music alumni
21st-century classical violinists
Women classical violinists